Henrich Ravas (born 16 August 1997) is a Slovak professional footballer who plays as a goalkeeper for Widzew Łódź.

Club career

Tenures in England
Ravas started his career with Myjava in 2014. In 2015, Ravas signed for National League North club Boston United following a successful trial after previously being with Peterborough United on non-contract terms.

On 7 January 2016, Ravas signed for Championship side Derby County joining the club's under-23 side.

At the start of the 2017–18 season, Ravas moved on loan to National League North club Gainsborough Trinity. Ravas made 37 league appearances for the club and while Gainsborough were relegated, Ravas won the club's Young Player of the Year Award.

Ravas moved to Hartlepool United in October 2020 on a season long loan. At the end of the same month, Ravas made his debut for the club in a 6–0 win against Ilkeston Town in the FA Cup fourth qualifying round. Following an injury to Ben Killip in April 2021, Ravas became the club's number one goalkeeper. However, he later lost his place in the team to Brad James. Ravas made 13 appearances for Pools in all competitions as the club won promotion to League Two, however Ravas failed to make the match day squad for the National League play-off final.

Ravas was released by Derby at the end of the 2020–21 season.

FK Senica
Ravas signed for Fortuna Liga side FK Senica in July 2021. On 24 July 2021, Ravas made his debut at pod Čebraťom at Ružomberok, the match ended in a 0–0 draw. He left Senica in March 2022 after he had not been paid for four months.

Widzew Łódź
On 29 March 2022, he signed a three-month contract with an extension option with Polish I liga club Widzew Łódź, who at the time had only one other goalkeeper available, after Jakub Wrąbel and Konrad Reszka suffered season-ending injuries. Ravas made his debut for the club against GKS Tychy on 3 April 2022 in a 2–1 win. In May 2022, shortly after the club won promotion to the Ekstraklasa, Ravas signed a contract extension with Widzew Łódź.

International career
Ravas was first recognised in a Slovak senior national team nomination by Francesco Calzona on 8 November 2022, ahead of two friendly fixtures against Montenegro and Chile. During the nomination, numerous national team newcomers first penetrated the short-listed squad as clubs were not required to release their players and multiple opted to, leaving free spots in the nomination. On both occasions, at Podgorica City Stadium on 17 November versus Montenegro, as well as home retirement match for Marek Hamšík on 20 November versus Chile, Ravas was benched and did not enter play. Few weeks later, Ravas was also called up for prospective national team players' training camp hosted at NTC Senec in early December along with three younger goalkeepers from Slovak Fortuna Liga. Ravas was called up for his first qualifying campaign ahead of UEFA Euro 2024 in Calzona's nomination of March 2023 ahead of matches versus Luxembourg and Bosnia and Herzegovina.

Career statistics

Honours
Widzew Łódź
I liga runner-up: 2021–22

Individual
Gainsborough Trinity Young Player of the Year: 2017–18

References

External links
 
 
 
 Futbalnet profile 

1997 births
Living people
Sportspeople from Senica
Slovak footballers
Slovak expatriate footballers
Association football goalkeepers
Spartak Myjava players
Boston United F.C. players
Derby County F.C. players
Gainsborough Trinity F.C. players
Hartlepool United F.C. players
FK Senica players
Widzew Łódź players
National League (English football) players
Slovak Super Liga players
I liga players
Ekstraklasa players
Expatriate footballers in England
Slovak expatriate sportspeople in England
Expatriate footballers in Poland
Slovak expatriate sportspeople in Poland